Nobuyuki Yoshigahara ( Yoshigahara Nobuyuki, commonly known as "Nob"; May 27, 1936 – June 19, 2004) was perhaps Japan's most celebrated inventor, collector, solver, and communicator of puzzles.

Nob graduated from the Tokyo Institute of Technology in applied chemistry. After becoming disenchanted with his career in high-polymer engineering, Nob turned to high school teaching as an educator of chemistry and mathematics.

As a puzzle columnist, Nob was an active contributor to many journals and had monthly columns in various popular magazines, including Quark. He penned over 80 books on puzzles. Perhaps best known as a puzzle inventor, he commercially licensed his designs, such as the Rush Hour puzzle game, to companies including Binary Arts (now known as ThinkFun), Ishi Press, and Hanayama. He was also an avid computer programmer who used computers to help solve mathematical puzzles.

Nob was an active participant in the International Puzzle Party, traveling the world to attend the annual event. In 2005, the puzzle design competition of the International Puzzle Parties was renamed the Nob Yoshigahara Puzzle Design Competition.

In 2003, the Association of Game & Puzzle Collectors awarded Nob with the Sam Loyd Award, given to individuals who have made a significant contribution to the world of mechanical puzzles.

See also 
Puzzle
Mechanical puzzle
Kagen Sound
Nob Yoshigahara Puzzle Design Competition

References

External links 
Ed Pegg Jr. Nob Yoshigahara, June 28, 2004.
Example mechanical puzzles by Nob Yoshigahara
Association of Game & Puzzle Collectors
Nob Yoshigahara Puzzle Design Competition
Barry Arthur Cipra, Erik D. Demaine, Marin L. Demaine, and Tom Rodgers. Tribute to a Mathemagician. — A K Peters, 2005. — 262 с. — .

1936 births
2004 deaths
Puzzle designers
Mathematics popularizers
Recreational mathematicians
Tokyo Institute of Technology alumni